"She's Got a Reason" is a song by English punk rock band Dogs and is featured on their debut album, Turn Against This Land. Released on 21 February 2005, it was the second single taken from the album and it charted in the UK Top 40 at #36.

Track listing

"She's Got a Reason" - 3:28
"Why Do We Do It to Ourselves" - 4:31
"Spring's Not Always Green" - 2:58

2005 singles
Dogs (British band) songs
2005 songs
Island Records singles